WITS or Wits may refer to:


Acronym
 Wales Interpretation and Translation Service, a Welsh not-for-profit organisation
 Water Industry Telemetry Standard, a communications protocol
 Wellsite Information Transfer Specification, used by the petroleum industry
 Wisconsin Institute for Torah Study, an orthodox Jewish yeshiva in Milwaukee, Wisconsin
 Women in Technology and Science, an Irish organisation 
 Workshop on Information Technologies and Systems, an academic conference on information systems
 World Integrated Trade Solution, a trade database provided by the World Bank
 Worldwide Incidents Tracking System, a discontinued publicly accessible terrorism database
 Worldwide Industrial Telemetry Standards, a suite of public utility protocols

Arts and entertainment
 The Wits, a 17th-century English comedy play by Sir William Davenant
 The Wits, a 17th-century collection of comic sketches by Francis Kirkman
 the title school of WITS Academy, a 2015 teen sitcom on Nickelodeon

Other uses
 Herman Wits (1636–1708), Dutch theologian
 Bidvest Wits F.C., a South African football club
 University of the Witwatersrand, Johannesburg, South Africa
 WITS (AM), an AM radio station in Sebring, Florida

See also 
 Wit (disambiguation)
 Witts, a surname
 Witz (disambiguation)